Joseph Haydn's Symphony No. 17 in F major, Hoboken I/17, may have been written between 1757 and 1763.

It is scored for 2 oboes, bassoon, 2 horns, strings and continuo. It is in three movements:

Allegro, 
Andante, ma non troppo, F minor 
Allegro molto,

References

Symphony 017
Compositions in F major